John James Hardy (10 February 1899 – 1932) was an English professional footballer who played as a centre-half.

References

1899 births
1932 deaths
Footballers from Sunderland
English footballers
Association football defenders
Wearmouth Colliery F.C. players
Sunderland Celtic F.C. players
South Shields F.C. (1889) players
Derby County F.C. players
Grimsby Town F.C. players
Oldham Athletic A.F.C. players
Boldon Colliery Welfare F.C. players
Scarborough F.C. players
West Stanley F.C. players
Leyton Orient F.C. players
Silksworth Colliery F.C. players
English Football League players
Date of death missing